Blood & Chemistry is the debut full-length studio album by the British alternative rock band Arcane Roots, released in 2013 on Play It Again Sam.

Background
On 17 April 2013, Arcane Roots released a teaser video for the album, alongside the release date and a UK headline tour in April–May 2013.

Critical reception
Clash called the album "full of unabashed, unreserved rock thrills - a potent, powerful document of a band on the rise, it matches the unbridled energy of their live show to a mature control of the studio." The Guardian called it "a record of elaborate verses, heartfelt choruses and skipping time signatures worthy of late-period Biffy Clyro."

Track listing

Personnel
All personnel credits adapted from Blood & Chemistrys liner notes.

Arcane Roots
Andrew Groves - vocals, guitar
Adam Burton - bass, vocals
Daryl Atkins - drums, cover artwork, design

Production
Dan Austin - production
Chris Coulter - mixing, additional engineering and production
Andy 'Hippie' Baldwin - mastering

References

External links
Teaser Video on YouTube

2013 debut albums
PIAS Recordings albums
Arcane Roots albums
Albums produced by Dan Austin